Sir Timothy John Besley,  (born 14 September 1960) is a British academic economist who is the School Professor of Economics and Political Science and Sir W. Arthur Lewis Professor of Development Economics at the London School of Economics (LSE).

He is also a commissioner on the National Infrastructure Commission, a Quondam Fellow of All Souls College, Oxford, and the director of the Suntory and Toyota International Centres for Economics and Related Disciplines (STICERD) at the LSE. In 2018, he served as president of the Econometric Society, and from 2006 to 2009 he was an external member of the Bank of England's Monetary Policy Committee. He won the 2005 Yrjö Jahnsson Award.

Early life and education
Born in Lincolnshire, Sir Tim Besley attended Aylesbury Grammar School and then studied at Oxford University, where he gained a BA in Philosophy, Politics, and Economics (PPE) with First Class Honours from Keble College, winning the George Webb Medley Prize for best exam performance in his cohort for his second and third years. He continued his graduate studies at Oxford, receiving an MPhil in economics with Distinction and the George Webb Medley Prize for the best MPhil performance in his cohort, followed by a DPhil in Economics upon election as an Examination Fellow of All Souls College in 1984.

Career 
Besley's first position was as an assistant professor in the economics department and Woodrow Wilson School of Public and International Affairs at Princeton University, before returning to the UK in 1995 as professor of economics at LSE. He has served as the director of the Suntory-Toyota International Centres for Economics and Related Disciplines (STICERD), and as a member of the Steering Group for the International Growth Centre. He served on the Bank of England's Monetary Policy Committee from September 2006 to August 2009.

Other activities 
Besley is a research fellow of the Centre for Economic Policy Research, and a member of the Economic Growth and Institutions Programme of the Canadian Institute for Advanced Research (CIFAR). He is a past research fellow of the Institute for Fiscal Studies and was a member of the Mirrlees Review committee. He is also a co-chair of the LSE Growth Commission and a member of the National Infrastructure Commission.

On the international level, Besley has served as a consultant to the World Bank and to the European Bank for Reconstruction and Development. In June 2021, he was appointed to the World Bank–International Monetary Fund High-Level Advisory Group (HLAG) on Sustainable and Inclusive Recovery and Growth, co-chaired by Mari Pangestu, Ceyla Pazarbasioglu, and Nicholas Stern.

Besley has been an associate editor for the Quarterly Journal of Economics and an editor for Economica

Research 

Besley's research is focused on aspects of economic policy formation in developed and emerging market economies.  He is one of the leading economists in restoring the study of political economy to prominence in mainstream economics.

A selected bibliography includes:
 "Principled Agents: The Political Economy of Good Government", Oxford University Press, 2006.
 "Pillars of Prosperity: The Political Economics of Development Clusters", Princeton University Press, 2011 (with Torsten Persson).
 "Incumbent Behavior:  Vote Seeking, Tax Setting and Yardstick Competition" (with Anne Case). American Economic Review, 85 (1), 25–45, 1995.
 "Property Rights and Investment Incentives:  Theory and Evidence from Ghana", Journal of Political Economy, 103(5), 903–937, 1995.
 "An Economic Model of Representative Democracy" (with Stephen Coate), Quarterly Journal of Economics, 112(1), 85–114, 1997.
 "The Political Economy of Government Responsiveness: Theory and Evidence from India", (with Robin Burgess), Quarterly Journal of Economics, 117(4), 1415–1452, 2002.
 "Competition and Incentives with Motivated Agents", (with Maitreesh Ghatak), American Economic Review, 95(3), 616–636, 2005.
 "The Origins of State Capacity: Property Rights, Taxation and Politics", (with Torsten Persson) American Economic Review, 99(4), 1218–44, 2009.
 "The Logic of Political Violence", (with Torsten Persson) Quarterly Journal of Economics, 126 (3), 1411–1446, 2011.
 "State Capacity, Reciprocity and the Social Contract", Econometrica, 88(4) 1307–1335, 2020.

Honours and awards
Sir Tim Besley is a Fellow of the British Academy, a fellow of the Econometric Society, and a foreign honorary member of the American Economic Association and the American Academy of Arts and Sciences.  He was a co-editor of American Economic Review – the first person to serve in this position not based at a US university. He is the 2010 president of the European Economic Association. From 2014 to 2017, he served as president of the International Economic Association. In 2018, he began serving as president of the Econometric Society.  In 2005, he won the Yrjö Jahnsson Award for European economics and was awarded the 2010 John von Neumann Award by the Rajk László College for Advanced Studies at Corvinus University of Budapest. Besley was appointed a Commander of the Order of the British Empire (CBE) in the 2010 Birthday Honours for services to Social Science, and a Knight Bachelor in the 2018 New Year Honours for services to Economics and Public Policy. For 2022 he was awarded the BBVA Foundation Frontiers of Knowledge Award.

Personal life

Besley married political economist Gillian Paull in 1993, and has two sons. He lives in Barnes, Richmond upon Thames in London. He is a fan of Fulham Football Club.

Works 
 Principled agents?: the political economy of good government, Oxford University Press, 2006, 
  Delivering on the promise of pro-poor growth: insights and lessons from country experiences, Editors Timothy Besley, Louise Cord, World Bank Publications, 2007,

References 

1961 births
Academics of the London School of Economics
Alumni of Keble College, Oxford
20th-century British economists
21st-century British economists
Commanders of the Order of the British Empire
Knights Bachelor
Fellows of All Souls College, Oxford
Fellows of Keble College, Oxford
Fellows of the American Academy of Arts and Sciences
Fellows of the British Academy
Fellows of the Econometric Society
Presidents of the Econometric Society
Living people
People educated at Aylesbury Grammar School
Alumni of Nuffield College, Oxford
Fellows of the European Economic Association